Bomb damage assessment (BDA), also known as battle damage assessment, is the practice of assessing damage inflicted on a target from a stand-off weapon, most typically a bomb or air launched missile. It is part of the larger discipline of combat assessment. Assessment is performed using many techniques including footage from in-weapon cameras, gun cameras, forces on the ground near the target, satellite imagery and follow-up visits to the target. Preventing information on battle damage reaching the enemy is a key objective of military censorship. For nuclear weapons special techniques may be required due to the extensive damage caused and difficulty in approaching the site.

History of bomb damage assessment
Originally, BDA was required due to the disconnected nature of aerial bombardment during World War I. It became necessary to send ground forces to an area to determine whether the damage was effective, or to overfly the target again. Either situation was difficult to accomplish safely. Starting with this conflict, specialized equipment has been used specifically for BDA type missions. Originally these were aircraft which were converted fighters or bombers (which in the USAAF were given a new RQ designation). Photographic reconnaissance was used extensively in World War II. From the 1950s onwards satellites became available, as well as high altitude surveillance planes such as the Lockheed U-2 and the Lockheed SR-71. During the Viet Nam War, U.S. special operations and regular ground components often performed on-the-ground BDAs in operational areas where U.S. forces had a presence.

BDA may be performed using information released accidentally by the enemy. In World War II, United Press International transmitted a report on the damage caused by the Japanese raid on Pearl Harbor including details on the number of damaged warships and shore installations.

In more recent conflicts, special operations forces (SOF) have taken part in BDA, both through physical presence, and conducting overflies with equipment such as the RQ-4 Global Hawk UAV. The Israeli Defence Force includes two teams dedicated to both target designation and BDA.

BDA was used during the two Gulf Wars, both during the conflict and retrospectively. In the opening days of the air campaign of the 1991 Gulf War it was used to assess the damage to key Iraqi installations including its nuclear reactors. At the conclusion of the 2003 invasion of Iraq a joint team from the allied nations (including Britain, the United States and Australia) assessed the damage caused to almost 400 sites across the country to determine the effectiveness of weapon strikes.

As the field has advanced and the quantity of available data has increased, statistical techniques have been introduced to improve the speed and quality of data analysis.

Objectives of bomb damage analysis

Bomb damage assessment has a number of objectives. The assessment will attempt to determine if the munition functioned properly and according to its design. An estimate will be made of the extent of physical damage (through munitions blast, fragmentation, and/or fire damage effects) to the target. This assessment is based upon observed or interpreted damage. Collateral and additional damage is also assessed in this process. Estimates will be made of the degree to which the military value of the target has been degraded in respect of its intended mission. Finally the overall impact on the enemy's capability will be assessed.

The future of bomb damage assessment

After the end of hostilities in the 1991 Gulf War, the Battle Damage Assessment Working Group (BDAWG) was formed at the behest of MTIC, the Military Targeting Intelligence Committee. Largely, this group sought to create a standard lexicon of terminology for describing BDA, and to develop an outlook for the future of BDA.

Possible future techniques involve using lasers or particle beams in a manner similar to side scan sonar to map, in three dimensions, the condition of a target. Boeing has developed a system whereby a BDA "sensor" is towed a third of a kilometer behind the munition. This system is supposed to be capable of near real-time BDA by directly observing the interaction of the munition with the target.

Limitations of bomb damage assessment

BDA relies on humans to interpret and analyze the data collected from various sources. Despite improvements in the data capture techniques limitations were exposed following the 1991 Gulf War in the assessment process when the data supplied by on-board cameras was not analysed correctly. This flawed analysis resulted in incorrect or incomplete information being given to local commanders on the extent of the damage caused.  In particular the analysis did not reliably identify whether a target had been damaged (but remained militarily viable) or was no longer a threat.

Use of misinformation
Information on bomb damage is highly valuable to the enemy and military intelligence and censors will endeavour to conceal, exaggerate or underplay the extent of damage depending on the circumstances. Following the Bluff Cove Air Attacks during the Falklands War, the British military misled the media into exaggerating the real casualty numbers from less than 50 killed to a range of 400–900 killed and wounded. This misinformation is believed to have contributed to the weak resistance faced by the British during the subsequent assault on Port Stanley.

References 

Aerial bombing
Intelligence services of World War II